Histidine methyl ester (HME) is an irreversible histidine decarboxylase inhibitor. It is the methyl ester of histidine.

See also
Histidine decarboxylase
Alpha-Fluoromethylhistidine

References

Histidine decarboxylase inhibitors
Amino acid derivatives
Imidazoles
Methyl esters
Carboxylate esters